The 2013 MAVTV 500 IndyCar World Championships was the 19th and final showdown of the 2013 IndyCar Series season. The event took place on October 19, at the  Auto Club Speedway in Fontana, California.

It was the final race for Izod as the series' main sponsor, as Verizon Communications took over as title sponsor from 2014.

This was the first race without Dario Franchitti In the field since the 2008 Peak Antifreeze Indy 300

Report
Will Power, who won the pole position in qualifying, won the race leading 103 laps. Scott Dixon, who finished 5th, won the championship, defeating Hélio Castroneves by 27 points.

A. J. Allmendinger returned to Team Penske, driving the #2 car. J. R. Hildebrand drove the #98 Honda for Barracuda Racing. Will Power, from the pole, quickly lost the lead to a faster Sébastien Bourdais who dominated the first quarter of the race. Meanwhile, Castroneves rises from 10th to 5th place and watched the battle for the lead between Kanaan, Hunter-Reay, Bourdais and a fast Carlos Muñoz while Dixon keep the pace in 15th place.

At lap 111, Justin Wilson lost the rear of his car and was avoided by Josef Newgarden who collected Oriol Servià on the process. Then Wilson was hit by Tristan Vautier involving also James Jakes and Simona de Silvestro on the accident. Wilson was sent to the local hospital with minor fractures.

At the checkered flag Will Power finally grabbed the win at Fontana, followed by Ed Carpenter and Tony Kanaan. Dixon finished at 5th place, which was enough to give him the season title, while Castroneves had a tough night and finished 6th. Dixon become the new three time Indycar Series Champion, winning previously in 2003 and 2008.

Top 10 results

Points standings after the race

References

MAVTV
MAVTV 500
MAVTV 500 IndyCar World Championships
MAVTV 500 IndyCar World Championships